Darkness (1985) is a collection of short stories by  Bharati Mukherjee.

Contents

External links
Literary Encyclopedia (in progress).

1985 short story collections
Asian-American short story collections
Short story collections by Bharati Mukherjee
American short story collections
Literature by Asian-American women